Snow Buddies is a 2008 American adventure comedy film and the second installment in the Air Buddies series. It was released on DVD on February 5, 2008. The film takes place in the fictional town of Ferntiuktuk, Alaska.

It is the final installment in the series to feature Buddy himself as well as any characters from the Air Bud films.

Plot
Air Bud's five Golden Retriever puppies known as the Buddies from the town of Fernfield, Washington are having fun with their new owners before they go to school. The puppies meet up in the park and decide to play hide and seek. Budderball sees an ice cream truck and decides to go in, forcing the others to try and rescue him. However, the Buddies become trapped in a truck heading to Ferntiuktuk, Alaska. Upon arrival, the Buddies meet Shasta, a Siberian Husky puppy whose 11-year-old owner, Adam Bilson, is determined to win the Alaskan sled dog race because of what had happened to his father, due to a tragic accident a year prior. The puppies decide to help Shasta pursue his dreams as well as get to the airport, located at the finish line. Unfortunately, as Shasta's parents are both dead, this puts the puppies in a predicament as there is nobody to teach them how to become snow dogs. Fortunately, Shasta manages to persuade a legendary Alaskan Malamute named Talon, who had taught Shasta's deceased father, into teaching the puppies.

When Shasta introduces Adam to his new sleigh team, the child is delighted at the prospect of his dreams finally coming true and the team pursue vigorous training routines. Adam begins building a new sleigh with his team of hard-working puppies. Talon proudly watches as the team's efforts come to fruition and it seems as though they are cooperating as a team. The older town huskies, however, are not impressed and begin to plan their downfall. Two of the huskies Francois and Philippe, reveal to the Buddies that Shasta's parents were killed during a dog sled race  (sitka) last year when the ice beneath them shattered to dishearten them.

Talon calls the puppies to the mountain lake one night to view the Northern Lights (juno) before he goes of telling Shasta that he knows all he needs to know and that he can become the great leader that his father once was; once all the puppies say their goodbyes to him,  Talon disappears into the lights. The following morning, the puppies enter the race with Adam. But everyone else laughs at the thought of a little boy and puppies entering a race. The sheriff goes over the rules and sees Adam wrote his own name in the entry list. After being reminded how treacherous the race is by the sheriff, the puppies begin their track while Jean George III, an unscrupulous and arrogant French musher-(who is hated by nearly everyone in town) and last year's champion, cheats his way through every race by sabotaging the other mushers' sleds or pushing them off their sleds. Soon only young Adam and Jean George are left but news of a terrible blizzard arrives and it's too late to call off the race as the racers have already gotten past the midway checkpoint.

Meanwhile, the puppies' parents, Buddy and Molly follow the puppies to Alaska, after being tipped by Himalayan cat Miss Mittens, where the Saint Bernard dog Bernie informs them of their participation in the race. Sheriff Ryan gets a message sent by Fernfield's Deputy Dan asking for any information on the Buddies. The Sheriff immediately phones Deputy Dan to inform him that the Buddies are in Alaska, who then goes to inform their owners at their treehouse about the good news, much to their delight. A dangerous blizzard forces Adam and the team to take shelter in an igloo provided by an Inuit until the storm subsides. They come head to head with Jean George, and Adam gets injured.

Adam then recovers while Francois and Philippe, the lead dogs of Jean George's team, get into trouble when the ice beneath them shatters. Jean George continues and abandons his dogs while Adam and the puppies begin a rescue operation despite Shasta's fears of his parents death, revealing that they had died from drowning. The puppies pull Francois and Philippe out of the icy waters and Jean George continues the race without any gratitude and abandons their rescuers. Francois and Philippe realize they owe nothing to their owner for leaving them to die, and everything to Shasta and the Buddies for rescuing them, and so, decide to "go on strike". They stop and refuse to run any further, causing Jean George to lose the race.

Adam is victorious and the Buddies reunite with Buddy and Molly. Jean George scolds his dogs for embarrassing him, and they respond by chasing him around the Arctic. The Buddies sadly say goodbye to their new best friend, Shasta, as well as Adam, and both groups promise that they will stay in touch with each other. All seven Buddies return home via airplane and are greeted by their owners Sam, Bartleby, Billy, Alice, Pete, Henry and Noah; who were waiting for them. Budderball and his owner, Bartleby, are watching the news the next day and Bartleby is completely dumbstruck when he watches the part about the Buddies, Adam, and Shasta winning the race. That night, Buddy and Molly sit on the roof of their house and discuss their puppies' accomplishments, while wondering if they will ever outgrow exploring. The film ends with Adam and a now nearly full-grown Shasta hiking through Alaska on a cold, winter night with five new adult huskies, while Talon narrates a reminder for the audience that "life may lead you where you least expect, but have faith, and you'll know exactly where you were meant to be".

Cast

Skyler Gisondo as B-Dawg
Jimmy Bennett as Buddha
Josh Flitter as Budderball
Henry Hodges as Mudbud
Liliana Mumy as Rosebud
Tom Everett Scott as Buddy
Molly Shannon as Molly
Kris Kristofferson as Talon, an Alaskan Malamute
Jim Belushi as Bernie, a St. Bernard
Paul Rae as Phillipe, Jean George's secondary lead husky
Lothaire Bluteau as Francois, Jean George's primary lead husky
Whoopi Goldberg as Miss Mittens, a Himalayan cat
Christian Pikes as Henry
John Kapelos as Jean George
Dylan Sprouse as Shasta, a Siberian Husky puppy
Richard Karn as Patrick
Dominic Scott Kay as Adam Bilson
Cynthia Stevenson as Jackie
Dylan Minnette as Noah

Home video
Walt Disney Studios Home Entertainment released the film on Blu-ray on January 31, 2012. The disc comes with bonus features which include a narration by the director on the visual effects and an audio commentary by the Buddies and Shasta. Other features include a music video, bloopers and behind the scenes.

Production
An American Humane Certified Safety Representative visited the Snow Buddies set the first day of filming. Fifteen Golden Retriever puppies were on set and fifteen other were being treated by a local veterinarian, and their illnesses were eventually diagnosed as Giardia and Coccidia. On request from the representative the remaining puppies on set received additional veterinary checks. Twenty-five of the puppies were from an American breeder and five were from a Canadian breeder. It was discovered that the puppies were approximately 8 weeks old, which lead to the belief that the puppies were only 6 weeks old when they were brought by the trainer to the movie set. Per the USDA it was at the time illegal to transport puppies under the age of 8 weeks.

After the removal of all 30 puppies, 28 older Golden Retriever puppies were brought in to continue filming. All of the 28 older puppies were exposed to parvovirus, and six fell ill after exposure to the virus.

As a result, the movie was not permitted to use the "No animals were harmed..." disclaimer and received an Unacceptable marking from the American Humane Association.

References

External links

2008 direct-to-video films
American direct-to-video films
2000s English-language films
Disney direct-to-video films
Films about dogs
Films about animals playing sports
Films directed by Robert Vince
Air Bud (series)
Animal cruelty incidents in film
Disney controversies
Films set in Washington (state)
Films set in Alaska
Films shot in Vancouver
Canadian direct-to-video films
American sequel films
Canadian sequel films
Canadian sports comedy films
American sports comedy films
2008 films
2000s American films
2000s Canadian films